Ashgill is a village in South Lanarkshire, Scotland near Larkhall. It is part of the Dalserf parish. The village church dates back to 1889 

The village has a shop

The local school was first in Scotland to have an automated bell, installed in 1947.

Famous residents 
Jim McLean Scottish football player

References

Villages in South Lanarkshire